Fred Sablan is an American musician originally from Cupertino, California, who is best known for formerly being the bassist for Marilyn Manson from 2010 until June 2014. He played bass on tour for artists such as Goon Moon in 2007, Chelsea Wolfe in 2017, and Peter Hook and the Light in 2018. Sablan was co-host of the Hour Of Goon podcast with former Marilyn Manson bandmate Jeordie White from 2016 to 2017. Currently, he plays bass for Heavens Blade and is the touring bassist for Deftones since 2022, filling in for the departed Sergio Vega.

Musical career

Goon Moon (2007)
Since July 2007, Sablan has been involved as both a live bassist and occasional guitarist for Jeordie White and Chris Goss side project Goon Moon.

Marilyn Manson (2010–2014)
In July 2010, it was revealed that Sablan had been named as the new bass player for Marilyn Manson. He was involved with the recording and writing of the album Born Villain. Touring for the Hey, Cruel World Tour started in February 2012 at the Soundwave Festival in Australia and then in Japan. Sablan completed touring on the Hey, Cruel World Tour, Twins of Evil, and Masters of Madness tours by July 2013 in the US and Europe. He departed the band in June 2014.

Recording and touring (2014-present)
Sablan has recorded with a few projects, including hip hop artist Cage and the band Marriages (featuring Emma Ruth Rundle) . He has also performed live with 8mm , Spirit in the Room, Kidneythieves, Gina And The Eastern Block, Peter Hook and the Light, Wes Borland and Chelsea Wolfe .

Heavens Blade  (2018–present)
In October of 2018, it was announced that Sablan had formed a hardcore punk band called Heavens Blade with Sara Taylor of Youth Code, Alex Lopez of Suicide Silence, and Piggy D of Rob Zombie, and released a single on Bandcamp. They released a five-song EP in the fall of 2019.

Deftones  (2022–present)
In April 2022, it was announced that Sablan had joined Deftones as bassist.

Discography
Crack
 1995: "Pooberty"
 1997: "Losing One's Cool"
Butcher Holler
 2003: "I Heart Rock"
Marilyn Manson
 2012:  Born Villain
Marriages
 2015: "Salome" (Fred plays guitar on 3 songs)
Heavens Blade
 2018: "Spoiled Rotten" single
 2019: 5 song EP

External links
 Twitter
 Bandcamp

References

Living people
American male guitarists
Guitarists from California
Goon Moon members
Marilyn Manson (band) members
Alternative metal bass guitarists
People from Cupertino, California
1970 births
American male bass guitarists
21st-century American bass guitarists
Industrial metal musicians
Peter Hook and The Light members